Tu Yidan (born 3 January 1997) is a Chinese field hockey player for the Chinese national team.

She participated at the 2018 Women's Hockey World Cup.

References

1997 births
Living people
Chinese female field hockey players
Youth Olympic gold medalists for China
21st-century Chinese women